The Beckman Institute at Caltech is a multi-disciplinary center for research in the chemical and biological sciences, located at and partnering with the California Institute of Technology (Caltech) in Pasadena, California, United States.

Founding
Founding of the Beckman Institute at Caltech was supported by a major philanthropic gift from the Arnold Orville Beckman and his wife Mabel, through the Arnold and Mabel Beckman Foundation. Beckman had a long-term relationship with Caltech as a student, teacher and trustee.  After discussions with chemists Harry B. Gray and Peter Dervan, and biologists Eric H. Davidson and Leroy Hood, Beckman announced in 1986 that he would donate $50 million to establish the institute and an accompanying endowment. The Beckman Institute at Caltech was chartered by Caltech in 1987.

The institute building was designed by architect Albert C. Martin, Jr. in a Spanish style with a pool and a central courtyard. It was dedicated on October 26, 1989, and opened in 1990. The building included four levels of laboratory space, libraries, and archives.

Mission
The institute's mission was to foster innovative research in the chemical and biological sciences. A strong emphasis was placed on instrumentation, both in developing new research technologies, and in making facilities available to researchers across the university.

Organizational structure

Four Caltech professors have served as directors of the Beckman Institute:

 Harry B. Gray, Arnold O. Beckman Professor of Chemistry (1986–2001)
 Barbara Wold, Bren Professor of Molecular Biology (2001–2012) 
 David A. Tirrell, Ross McCollum-William H. Corcoran Professor of Chemistry and Chemical Engineering (2012–2018)  
 Dennis A. Dougherty, George Grant Hoag Professor of Chemistry (2018–Present)

Within the institute were nine resource centers, each focusing on a different area of research.  A tenth resource center has since been added. , the resource centers and their principal investigators and directors were as follows:

 Center for Computational Regulatory Genomics: Eric H. Davidson, Principal investigator; R. Andrew Cameron, Director
 CLOVER (CLARITY, Optogenetics, and Vector Engineering Research Center):  Viviana Gradinaru, principal investigator; Ben Deverman, director
 Functional Genomics Resource Center: Barbara Wold, principal investigator; Brian Williams, director
 Laser Resource Center: Harry B. Gray, principal investigator; Jay R. Winkler, director
 Mass Spectrometry Resource Center: Jack Beauchamp, principal investigator
 Molecular Materials Resource Center: Nate Lewis, principal investigator; Bruce S. Brunschwig, director
 Molecular Observatory: Douglas C. Rees, principal investigator; Jens Kaiser, director
 Programmable Molecular Technology Center: Niles Pierce, principal investigator; Harry M. T. Choi, director
 Proteome Exploration Lab: Raymond Deshaies, principal investigator; Sonja Hess, director
 Transmission Electron Microscopy: Grant Jensen, principal investigator; Alasdair McDowall, director

References

California Institute of Technology buildings and structures
Research institutes in California
1982 establishments in California
Science and technology in Greater Los Angeles